Caroline Walker (born 1982) is a Scottish-born contemporary visual artist based in London. She is known for voyeuristic paintings of women working.

Walker is born in Dunfermline.

Education
Walker obtained a bachelor's degree in painting from Glasgow School of Art. She earned her master’s from Royal College of Art in London.

Work
Walker used to conceptualize scenes and hire models to depict it. She would take photographs and use it as a source in constructing oil paintings. In 2016, she began exploring the streets of London to find anonymous subjects in natural settings.

Walker captures intimate moments of women’s lives. She is known for realistic paintings of women at work. She highlights overlooked jobs — such as in nail bars, salons, hotels, the household etc. —  which are performed by women. There is a variety of socio-economic status among her subjects.

Walker’s works emit a voyeuristic approach to the viewers, as seen from a vantage point through windows, bannisters or from a certain height. It is further emphasized by how her works are often large, making it easy to envision oneself stepping into the scene.

Walker's art often exhibits painterly. Color is an important element for her so as to evoke a painting's aura or ambience.

Selected works
Pool Party (2013)
Pampered Pedis (2016)
Training (2017)
Apparition (2017)
Not Going Out (2017)
Three Maids (2018)
Abi (2018)
Making Fishcakes (2019)
Bathroom Sink Cleaning (2019)
Planting Decisions (2019)
Sewing (2019)
Drafting (2019)

References

Scottish women painters
1982 births
Living people
Alumni of the Glasgow School of Art
Alumni of the Royal College of Art